Sociedad Deportiva Reocín Femenino, formerly known as EMD Reocín and Reocín Racing, is the women's team of SD Reocín.

History
Reocín also represented Racing Santander while it played in the Spanish premier league between 2010 and 2012, wearing its kit and badge while remaining an independent club. For several years it was the only women's football team in Cantabria.

Despite financial strains (SD Reocín retired from Tercera División in December 2010) Reocín-Racing was 3rd in the second stage's Group B (an overall 13th position) in its first season in Primera División, qualifying for the 2011 Copa de la Reina, where they were knocked by eventual champion FC Barcelona. The team's economic situation was critical at the beginning of the 2011–12 season, but improved subsequently. However, the team was relegated as it ended last in the table with two wins and three draws in 38 matches.

In its return to Segunda División, with former international Pedro Munitis as coach, Reocín ended the 2012-13 season in Group 5's lower half of the table. In 2015, the team was relegated again and since 2016 does not play any competition.

Current squad
As of 1 May 2013 (reference)

Season to season

Source

See also
:Category:SD Reocín (women) players

References

Football clubs in Cantabria
Women's football clubs in Spain
Association football clubs established in 2001
2001 establishments in Spain